The Togavirus 5′ plus strand cis-regulatory element is an RNA element which is thought to be essential for both plus and minus strand RNA synthesis.

Genus Alphavirus belongs to the family Togaviridae. Alpha viruses  contain secondary structural motifs in the 5′ UTR  that allow them to avoid detection by IFIT1.

See also
 Rubella virus 3′ cis-acting element

References

External links 
 

Cis-regulatory RNA elements